Zinc finger and BTB domain containing 11 is a protein that in humans is encoded by the ZBTB11 gene.

References 
 

Transcription factors